Surnoli is a sweet Indian pancake popular among the Konkani community. This is known to be a Saraswat Brahmin dish. Surnolis have a puffy texture with holes, with a yellow color and are usually made about 10 inches in diameter. Surnolis are traditionally eaten for breakfast or afternoon tea, served with homemade butter.

Preparation
Surnoli batter is made by grinding together soaked rice mixed with poha, coconut, buttermilk, jaggery and turmeric into a smooth paste. The batter is fermented overnight and cooked covered on a griddle on one side.

See also
 Dosa

External links
Surnoli recipe from a Konkani recipe website
Udupi recipes

Karnataka cuisine
Konkani cuisine